Say Yes to the Dress: Randy Knows Best was an American reality television series on TLC. It follows events at Kleinfeld Bridal in Manhattan. The series is hosted by Randy Fenoli, who also appears in the Say Yes to the Dress series and spin-offs, including one of his own, Randy to the Rescue. In Say Yes to the Dress: Randy Knows Best, Randy Fenoli helps brides find their perfect wedding dress. Fenoli, a fashion director at Kleinfield Bridal in Manhattan and a star of TLC's hit wedding shows, gives his expertise to brides on do's and don'ts in a top 10 format. 
In 2011, the TLC network announced that they would be building off of the popular franchise Say Yes to the Dress and that they would premier the eight-part series "Say Yes to the Dress: Randy Knows Best". Each half-hour episode stars Randy Fenoli offering his top ten tips on a variety of bridal related categories.

Randy Fenoli
Fenoli is Kleinfeld's fashion director. In 2007, he debuted on television on the U.S. channel TLC with Say Yes To The Dress. Since 2011, he has hosted Say Yes to the Dress: Randy Knows Best. Fenoli has also designed his own bridal line.

Episodes

Season 1
 April 1, 2011: Top 10 Dresses for Every-Body
 April 8, 2011: Top 10 Dresses for Every Occasion
 April 15, 2011: Top 10 Biggest Bridal Mistake
 April 15, 2011: Top 10 Entourage No-No's
 July 1, 2011: Top 10 Big Budget Brides
 July 1, 2011: Top 10 Things to Know Before Buying a Dress
 October 21, 2011: Top 10 Men in a Bride's World
 October 28, 2011: Top 10 Most Outrageous Bridal Requests

Season 2
 January 4, 2013: Top 10 Momma Dramas
 January 4, 2013: Top 10 Budget Busting Brides
 January 11, 2013: Top 10 All in the Family Moments
 January 11, 2013: Top 10 Classic Brides
 January 18, 2013: Top 10 Most Heartfelt Moments
 January 25, 2013: Top 10 Most Memorable Brides

Say Yes to the Dress: Spin-offs
 Say Yes to the Dress: Atlanta (July–September 2010; July 2011–)
 Say Yes to the Dress: Bridesmaids
 Say Yes to the Dress: Monte's Take (July 2011 – February 2012)
 Say Yes to the Dress: Big Bliss (September–October 2010; April 2011–) 
 Say Yes to the Dress: Randy Knows Best (April 2011–)
 Randy To The Rescue (June 2012–August 2013)

References

External links

Facebook
TV Guide

2010s American reality television series
2011 American television series debuts
2013 American television series endings
Television shows set in New York City
TLC (TV network) original programming
Wedding television shows
American television spin-offs
Reality television spin-offs
Wedding dresses